Alu Potala Rasa is a spicy gravy-based curry that originates from Odisha, India. It is made with potala (pointed gourd) and aloo (potatoes).

Preparation
Ingredients to prepare this dish include potatoes, pointed gourd, ginger, garlic, onion, coconut, cumin, chilli powder, and turmeric powder.

See also
Oriya cuisine

References

Indian curries
Odia cuisine